HR 5256 is a star located thirty-three light-years away from the Sun in the northern circumpolar constellation of Ursa Major. It has an orange hue and is a challenge to view with the naked eye, having an apparent visual magnitude of 6.52 The distance to this star is very nearly 10 parsecs, so the absolute magnitude of 6.51 is nearly the same as the star's apparent magnitude.

This object is an ordinary K-type main-sequence star with a stellar classification of K3 V, which indicates it is undergoing core hydrogen fusion. It is over five billion years of age and is spinning slowly with a projected rotational velocity of 4.6 km/s. The star has an estimated 82% of the Sun's mass and 78% of the Sun's radius. It is radiating just 28% of the luminosity of the Sun from its photosphere at an effective temperature of 4,811 K.

References

K-type main-sequence stars
Ursa Major (constellation)
Durchmusterung objects
122064
068184
5256